Aharon 'Roni' Shuruk (born February 24, 1946) is a former Israeli football midfielder, who played for the Israel national team between 1969 and 1970. He was part of the Israel squad for the 1970 World Cup.

At club level, Shuruk played for Hakoah Ramat Gan, Maccabi Haifa and Hapoel Kfar Saba.

External links
 
 

1946 births
Israeli footballers
Association football midfielders
Israel international footballers
1970 FIFA World Cup players
Maccabi Haifa F.C. players
Living people